Ganesh Karnik is an Indian former military officer and politician who was the Member of the Karnataka Legislative Council from 22 June 2012 to 21 June 2018. He was the Chief Whip of the opposition party in Karnataka Legislative Council. He is a retired captain of the Indian Army and served along the north, east and western borders of India and voluntarily retired from the service. He has served Nitte Education Trust in various positions.

Early life 
Ganesh Karnik was born in the little town of Kervashe in Karkala Taluk of Udupi District, Karnataka. Having had his basic education in Karkala, he obtained his Degree in 1981 from Agricultural University Dharwad.

Military career 
Karnik joined the Indian army in 1981, and served as a commissioned officer along the North-East and the western border of the country. He got a voluntary retirement from the Army in 1988 as a Captain.

Political career 
He has been part of Rashtriya Swayamsevak Sangh. He is also involved in social activities and has collaborated with Ramakrishna Mission, Mangalore on Swach Bharath initiatives.

Karnik served as director at Nitte Education Trust, the umbrella organisation for all educational initiatives run by Shri Vinaya Hegde.

Karnik entered the field of politics as a member of the Karnataka Legislative Council in 2006 representing the South-west Teachers’ Constituency (which includes Dakshina Kannada, Udupi, Shimoga, Kodagu, Chikmagalur districts and Channagiri and Honnalli taluks of Davanagere district). He has represented the teachers in the Council.

In June 2012, Karnik was elected as a member of the Karnataka Legislative Council representing the Bangalore South-East Teachers’ Constituency. Currently he is the Chief Spokesperson of the BJP for Karnataka.

References 

 http://kla.kar.nic.in/mlc'list/SRI%20Ganesh%20karnik.htm
 Karnataka Legislative Council
 https://web.archive.org/web/20120129145631/http://www.nriforumkarnataka.org/index.php

External links 
 http://www.ganeshkarnik.com
 http://coastaldigest.com/index.php?option=com_content&view=article&id=18140:unfair-to-target-bjp-alone-exclusive-interview-with-capt-ganesh-karnic&catid=58:exclusive-news&Itemid=57
 http://www.daijiworld.com/chan/exclusive_arch.asp?ex_id=211
 https://archive.today/20121129053423/http://in.linkedin.com/pub/ganesh-karnik/29/95a/b97
 https://www.facebook.com/pages/Ganesh-karnik/143130962447694

Indian Army officers
Living people
People from Udupi
Members of the Karnataka Legislative Council
1959 births